Cryptologic Technician (CT) is a United States Navy enlisted rating or job specialty.  The CT community performs a wide range of tasks in support of the national intelligence-gathering effort, with an emphasis on cryptology and signal intelligence related products.

Most CT personnel are required to obtain and maintain security clearances.  Due to the highly classified and secure work environment requiring very restricted access, it is not always possible to share resources with other commands, leading to their shipboard nickname, "spooks".  Almost every detail surrounding the CT world from administration to operations to repair requires dedicated technicians with appropriate security clearances (this accounts for the many branches of the CT rating, i.e. CTI, CTM, CTN, CTO, CTR, CTT).  The contribution of an individual CT will depend upon the branch or career area.

Members of the CT community enjoy a wide range of career and training options.  Once trained, a CT might serve ashore, afloat, or in an airborne capacity.  Some CT sailors can expect overseas assignments of lengthy duration and some may never travel overseas.

Specialties
Administration (CTA) - Administrative and clerical duties that control access to classified material such as Special Security Officer (SSO) or Defense Courier Service (DCS). (No longer active.)
Interpretive (CTI) -  Interpretive are the Navy's linguists. They specialize in analysis of adversary developments, radiotelephone communications, and preparation of statistical studies and technical reports requiring knowledge of a foreign language.
Maintenance (CTM) - the installation, configuration, diagnosis, and repair of state-of-the-art electronic, computer, and network hardware and software systems.
Networks (CTN) - perform a variety of duties associated with computer network operations across global networks. A combination of technical and analytical computer network skills provides the situational awareness required to plan and execute information operations (IO) actions/ counteractions. (Rating was established from NEC Codes: 9301, 9302, 9303)
Collection (CTR) – perform a variety of duties worldwide at numerous overseas and stateside shore commands, aboard surface ships, aircraft, submarines, and Naval Special Warfare. Duties include performing collection, analysis, and reporting on communication signals using computers, specialized computer-assisted communications equipment, video display terminals, and electronic/magnetic tape recorders.
Synonymous with US Army job specialty 35S (Signals Collection Analyst) and US Marine MOS 2621 (Special Communications Signals Collection Operator)
Technical (CTT) - perform a variety of specialized duties associated with the collection and processing of airborne, shipborne, and land-based radar signals. They operate electronic intelligence receiving and direction finding systems, digital recording devices, analysis terminals, and associated computer equipment. Systems they operate produce high-power jamming signals used to deceive electronic sensors and defeat radar guided weapons systems. Additionally, intelligence derived from collection and processing update national databases which are crucial to tactical and strategic units throughout the world.  Non-communications signals intelligence (ELINT), Electronic Warfare Support (ES), Electronic Attack (EA), Electronic Protect (EP), Anti-Ship Missile Defense (ASMD), while a portion perform servicing and maintenance of various related electronic countermeasures systems (i.e., AN/SLQ-32) They can hold Navy Enlisted Classification such as  1702, 1733, 1734, 1736, 1737 which are primarily for the AN/SLQ-32, 8201, 8295, 8296 which are for Naval Aircrewman, 9135 for Subsurface,  1781 advanced apps, and also the 9141,9102 NEC's.

Rating changes

1942-43 Specialists (Q) (CR) Cryptographers - Established 1942-1943 changed to CT in 1948
1948 Communications Technician - Established 1948 from the ratings of Specialist (Q) (Cryptographers), Specialist (Q) (Radio Intelligence), Specialist (Q) (Technicians), and Radioman
26 March 1976, Communications Technician renamed to Cryptologic Technician (name alignment w/officer community). Establishes CTT, CTR, CTO, CTI,  CTA, CTM ratings.  
On October 1, 2003, Electronic Warfare Technicians (EW) were merged with CTT.
On October 1, 2007, CTA merged with Yeoman (YN), and Legalman. 
Cryptologic Technician Communications (CTO) cross-rated to CTN and the legacy CTOs merged with Information Systems Technician (IT).
CTM were scheduled to be disestablished in 2008, with certain skill sets converting to Electronics Technician (ET) and Information Systems Technician (IT) billets, but this has been set on hold for further planning.

Notable Cryptologic Technicians
CTICS Shannon M. Kent
CTTC Christian Pike 
CTRCS David Mclendon

See also

Defense Language Aptitude Battery (The test taken to become a CTI)
Defense Language Proficiency Tests (The tests taken to assess the skill level of CTIs)
List of United States Navy ratings

References

Navy Personnel Command
CTO RATING VISION

External links

Enlisted Rating Insignia
U.S. Naval Cryptologic Veterans Association
Public.navy.mil
http://www.navy.mil/submit/display.asp?story_id=29281

United States Navy ratings
Technicians
Naval intelligence
United States Navy sailors